Cape Christian Academy is a private Infant-12 Christian school in Middle Township, in Cape May County, in the U.S. state of New Jersey. It has a Cape May Court House postal address and is located within the Cape May Court House census-designated place. Richard Degener of The Press of Atlantic City described it as being in Burleigh. Its campus has  of area.

As of the 2019–20 school year, the school had an enrollment of 46 students (plus 12 in PreK) and 8.4 classroom teachers (on an FTE basis), for a student–teacher ratio of 5.5:1. The school's student body was 63.0% (29) White, 13.0% (6) Hispanic, 13.0% (6) two or more races, 6.5% (3) Asian and 4.3% (2) Black.

History
It was established circa 1990 as part of the merger of two other schools, Cape May County Christian School (CMCCS) and South Cape Christian Academy. The former opened, initially with grades Kindergarten through 2, either in 1976, or in September 1977, with an initial enrollment of 45–50. Its founder was Betty Gillingham. South Cape opened after CMCCS opened. South Cape, at Covenant Bible Church, was located in an area of Lower Township with a North Cape May postal address, though as of 2010 it was outside of the North Cape May CDP. Robert Thomson (died 1988), who is considered to be another co-founder of Cape Christian, served on the board of directors of one of the predecessor schools.

The initial enrollment was 300. Originally the merged school used rented facilities. The Kindergarten through grade 3 and 8-12 buildings were rented from Faith Fellowship Chapel and were located in Middle Township. First Assembly of God Church in Lower Township housed some of the Kindergarten and first grade classes. Covenant Bible Church housed grades 4–7. By 1993 it had 380 students.

In 1993 the school bought its current campus from Faith Fellowship Chapel. The purchase included the K-3 building, but not the 8-12 building. By 1994 it had  two campuses. The student count that year was almost 350. In 1995 the student count was about 350 and it still had two campuses.

References

External links
 

Private K-12 schools in New Jersey
Schools in Cape May County, New Jersey
Private high schools in Cape May County, New Jersey
Middle Township, New Jersey
Lower Township, New Jersey
Christian schools in New Jersey